Sager House is a historic home located at 12 West Cayuga Street in the village of Moravia in Cayuga County, New York.  It is a 2½-story, frame, Queen Anne–style residence, with a cruciform plan. The house was built in 1884. Also on the property is a 2-story, frame carriage house.  It was built by carpenters/construction managers James Patten and James Harris.

It was deemed architecturally significant "as an intact and representative example of Queen Anne style residential architecture in Moravia, associated with the village's post-Civil War prosperity." It was listed on the National Register of Historic Places in 1995.

References

External links

Houses on the National Register of Historic Places in New York (state)
Queen Anne architecture in New York (state)
Houses completed in 1884
Houses in Cayuga County, New York
National Register of Historic Places in Cayuga County, New York
Moravia (village), New York